The Taiwan Power Building, also known as Taipower Building or Taipower Headquarters, is a skyscraper office building in Zhongzheng District, Taipei, Taiwan. The tower was completed in 1983 and was designed by Kaku Morin. It houses the corporate headquarters of Taiwan Power Company and was the first building in Taiwan to surpass . The building overtook the First Commercial Bank Building in 1983 and became the tallest building in Taiwan from 1983 to 1988, before it was overtaken by TWTC International Trade Building.  

In 2018, although the Taiwan Power Building had been completed for 36 years, through the integration of smart energy conservation, using the Intelligent Building Energy Management System, it monitored and analyzed its energy usage, updated the air conditioning system, and created a green computer room. It saves around 1.6 million kilowatt-hours of electricity and nearly 4,000 tonnes of water annually, and has thus been awarded the highest level of platinum certification for existing building renovations by the U.S. Green Building Certification Leadership in Energy and Environmental Design (LEED). It is the oldest LEED certified green building in Taiwan, receiving full marks to place in the top fifth percentile of office buildings worldwide, and only about 400 buildings in the world have received this certification.

See also 
 List of tallest buildings in Taiwan
 List of tallest buildings in Taipei
 Taiwan Power Company

References

1983 establishments in Taiwan
Office buildings completed in 1983
Skyscraper office buildings in Taipei